A dictator is a ruler who does not rule through democratic means. 

Dictator may also refer to:

Books
 Dictator (Cain novel), by Tom Cain
 Dictator (Harris novel), by Robert Harris
 Dictator novel, a genre of Latin American literature

Film
 The Dictator (1915 film), a silent film comedy directed by Oscar Eagle
 The Dictator (1922 film), a silent film comedy directed by James Cruze
 The Dictator (1935 film), a British historical drama film directed by Victor Saville
 The Dictator (2012 film), a comedy film starring Sacha Baron Cohen
 Dictator (2016 film), an Indian film starring Nandamuri Balakrishna
 The Great Dictator, a 1940 film starring Charlie Chaplin

Games
 Dictator, a vehicle in the G.I. Joe: A Real American Hero line of toys
 M. Bison, a villain from the Street Fighter video game series also known as Dictator.
 Video game , released in 1983 by DK'Tronics and running on Sinclair's ZX Spectrum

Government 
 Dictatorship, a form of government where political authority is monopolized by a single person or political entity
 Dictator perpetuo, a position held by Julius Caesar
 Roman dictator, in the Roman Republic, an extraordinary magistrate with the absolute authority to perform tasks beyond the authority of the ordinary magistrate

Military
 the Dictator. a type of Siege artillery in the American Civil War, specifically a mortar
 , a 64-gun third-rate ship of the line of the Royal Navy
 , a single-turreted ironclad monitor of the United States Navy

Music
 "Dictator" (Centerfold song), 1986
 "Dictator" (The Clash song)
 Dictator (Daron Malakian and Scars on Broadway album), 2018
 Dictator (Diaura album), 2011
 The Dictators, an American proto-punk and punk rock band

Other uses
 Dictator game, a game in experimental economics
 Dictator (beetle), a genus of beetles
 Studebaker Dictator, an automobile produced by the Studebaker Corporation of South Bend, Indiana from 1927 to 1937

See also
 The Dictator (disambiguation)